= Cyclocoela =

Obsolete subclass of comb jellies

Cyclocoela is a now-invalid classification of Ctenophora.
